The Lovers (Spanish:Los amantes) is a 1951 Mexican drama film directed by Fernando A. Rivero and starring Emilia Guiú, David Silva and Luis Aldás.

The film's art direction was by Manuel Fontanals.

Cast

References

Bibliography 
 Rosa Peralta Gilabert. Manuel Fontanals, escenógrafo: teatro, cine y exilio. Editorial Fundamentos, 2007.

External links 
 

1951 films
1951 drama films
Mexican drama films
1950s Spanish-language films
Films directed by Fernando A. Rivero
Mexican black-and-white films
1950s Mexican films